Thunder Pass may refer to:

Cinema
 Thunder Pass (1954 film)

Places
 Thunder Pass (Colorado), a mountain pass on the Continental Divide of the Americas in Rocky Mountain National Park, Colorado, United States.

See also